Heavyweight boxers Muhammad Ali and Bob Foster fought on November 21, 1972 in Stateline, Nevada. Ali won the bout by knocking out Foster in the eighth round. Ali knocked Foster down seven times and this was the only fight in which Ali ever suffered a cut. The bout was notable because it was one of the first boxing matches refereed by Mills Lane.

References

Foster
1972 in boxing
1972 in sports in Nevada
November 1972 sports events in the United States